Sennoy is a rural locality (a settlement) in Akhmatovsky Selsoviet, Narimanovsky District, Astrakhan Oblast, Russia. The population was 132 as of 2010. There are 6 streets.

Geography 
Sennoy is located 58 km south of Narimanov (the district's administrative centre) by road. Astrakhan-II is the nearest rural locality.

References 

Rural localities in Narimanovsky District